Bahia de Tembo is a beach on a secluded bay on the Pacific coast in Oaxaca, Mexico.  It can be accessed via an unsurfaced road that exits highway 200 roughly 5 km south of the San Pedro Pochutla junction.

There are currently no facilities or full-time residents at Bahia de Tembo, but fishermen from Pochutla and nearby Puerto Ángel can occasionally be found fishing for sardines and agujon at the surfline. Olive ridley sea turtles lay their eggs on this beach and are frequently seen offshore. The surf and currents in the bay can be very dangerous when the tide is changing, and there have been reports of drownings in the local waters.

References

External links 
 Otro Ahogado en Playas Oaxaqueñas (Spanish) 

Beaches of Oaxaca